Sandtoft is a hamlet in the civil parish of Belton, North Lincolnshire (Where the population is included), England.

Sandtoft has a public house, The Reindeer Inn.

RAF Sandtoft was an RAF Bomber Command airfield. It opened in April 1944, closed in November 1945 and was sold for civilian uses in 1955.  Today part of the site is Sandtoft Airfield and The Trolleybus Museum at Sandtoft, Europe's largest trolleybus museum, is on another part.

In 2021 it was incorrectly signposted as part of Yorkshire.

Sandtoft and nearby Epworth, Lincolnshire were centres of unrest during the 17th draining of The Fens.

References

Further reading

External links

Isle of Axholme website

Hamlets in Lincolnshire
Borough of North Lincolnshire